General elections were held in Bermuda on 1 October 2020 to elect all 36 members of the House of Assembly. On 21 August 2020 Premier Edward David Burt announced that Governor of Bermuda John Rankin has accepted his advice to call a snap election.  The election resulted in the largest victory for one party since party politics began in Bermuda in 1968, as the Progressive Labour Party won 62% of the vote and 30 of 36 seats (including 3 seats where they ran unopposed).

Electoral system
The 36 members of the House of Assembly are elected from single-member constituencies by first-past-the-post voting.

Contesting parties

Incumbent MPs not seeking re-election

Candidates by Parish 
The announced candidates are presented below, along with the incumbent candidates before the election. MPs who are not standing for re-election are marked (†). Government ministers and speakers are in bold, and party leaders are in italics.

St. George's Parish and St. David's Island

Hamilton Parish

Smith's Parish

Devonshire Parish

Pembroke Parish

Paget Parish

Warwick Parish

Southampton Parish 

 - Kae Thomas Palacio filed as a candidate for the FDM in constituency 31 but withdrew her candidacy and resigned from the FDM before election day.

Sandys Parish

Results

References 

Bermuda
Bermuda
2020 in Bermuda
Elections in Bermuda
October 2020 events in North America